Arangkada San Joseño (ASJ) (lit. Accelerate San Josean) is a city-based political party founded in San Jose del Monte, Bulacan by its leader, Arthur Robes. The party played a major role in the Imelda Papin disqualification for "failing its residency requirements".

2013 elections and Papin disqualification 
Veteran singer Imelda Papin was disqualified from running for congresswoman in the city, as the party's secretary-general, Zosimo Lorenzo, filed a petition for disqualification as the member alleged that Papin was a resident of Barangay Putik, North Fairview, Quezon City. Even the COMELEC reversed the petition, the COMELEC proclaimed that Arthur Robes will be the winner of the 2013 elections, since he had 63.16% (74,302) votes than Papin's 31.90% (37,526) votes. Robes was a candidate of the Liberal Party at this time. His wife, Rida, failed to win the mayor seat, while being the party's standard bearer at the same time.

2016 elections 
The party was successful in the elections because their standard bearer, Rida Robes won a congressional seat in its lone district, and their leader, Arthur Robes and his running mate, Efren Bartolome Jr, won their seats as mayor and vice-mayor, respectively. The party supported the two while they are candidates to the Liberal Party.

The party was named one of six major local parties by the Commission on Elections for the 2016 Philippine local elections. The major local parties are entitled to receive the 19th and 20th copies of the ERs and COCs in their respective provinces or regions.

2019 elections 
Arthur Robes successfully won his second term as the mayor San Jose del Monte in the 2019 elections, defeating the former mayor Reynaldo San Pedro, while becoming the party's standard bearer in the city. Efren Bartolome Jr. ran unopposed, gaining his second term and Rida Robes also won and gained her second term against Irene del Rosario in the congressional seat, being a candidate of PDP–Laban and the party supporting her.

References

External links

Local political parties in the Philippines
Politics of San Jose del Monte